Ridhima Pandey  (2008) is an Indian environmental activist who advocates for action against climate change. She has been likened to Greta Thunberg. When she was nine years old, she filed a suit against the Indian government for not taking enough steps to combat climate change. She also was one of the complainants to the United Nations, along with several other young climate activists, against several nations' failure to take action against the climate crisis.

Background 
Pandey lives in Haridwar,Uttarakhand, a state in the North of India. She is a daughter of Dinesh Pandey who works in Wildlife Trust India who is also a climate activist and has worked in Uttarakhand in this capacity for 16 years and her mother is Vinita Pandey who works for Forest Department for  Uttarakhand.

Her interest in climate change started when Pandey's home of Uttarakhand has been affected by severe weather over the past three years and in 2013, over 1000 people died in cause of floods and landslides. Almost 100,000 people had to be evacuated from the region. According to World Bank, climate change is likely to increase pressure on the water supply in India.

Climate activism

Legal action against the Indian Government 
At age nine, Pandey filed a lawsuit against the Indian Government on the basis that they had not taken the significant steps against climate change that they had agreed to in the Paris Agreement. This court case was presented in the National Green Tribunal (NGT), a court which was established in 2010 that deals solely with environmental cases. Pandey also asked the Government to prepare a plan to reduce carbon emissions and a nationwide plan to curb the impact of climate change, including reducing India's use of fossil fuels.

In an interview with The Independent. Pandey states:My Government has failed to take steps to regulate and reduce greenhouse gas emissions, which are causing extreme climate conditions. This will impact both me and future generations. My country has huge potential to reduce the use of fossil fuels, and because of the Government's inaction I approached the National Green Tribunal.The NGT dismissed her petition, stating that it was 'covered under the environment pact assessment'.

Complaint to the United Nations 

During her application for a Norwegian visa to go to Oslo, she heard about an organization for young climate activists. She approached the organization, and was selected to go to New York for the  2019 United Nations Climate Action summit.  During the summit, on 23 September 2019. Pandey with 15 other children, including Greta Thunberg, Ayakha Melithafa and Alexandria Villaseñor, filed a complaint to the United Nations Committee on the Rights of the Child, accusing Argentina, Brazil, Germany, France and Turkey to violate the Convention on the Rights of the Child by failing to address the climate crisis adequately.

She also join with Thunberg again when she was with other 13 children from around the word send a legal petition to Secretary-General of the United Nations, António Guterres to declare climate crisis as   global level 3 emergency on 2021.

Further activism 
In September 2019,  Pandey led a climate strike under the FridaysForFuture  in Dehradun and  also became a speaker for Xynteo Exchange  at the same month in Norway with  Ella Marie Hætta Isaksen.  Pandey  came back dealing with Indian government when she make an appeal to Narendra Modi to stop a plan to chop Aarey forest to build a metro car shed project 

Pandey has called for a complete ban on plastic, arguing that its continued production is the result of consumer demand. She has also called for the Indian government and local authorities to do more to clean the Ganga River. She said that while the government claims that it is cleaning the river, there hasn't been much change in the condition of the river.

Pandey is quoted on her biography on Children vs Climate Change as stating her aim: I want to save our future. I want to save the future of all the children and all people of future generations.

Recognition 
Pandey was on the list of the BBC's 100 Women announced on 23 November 2020. She also get an Mother Teresa Memorial Award for Social Justice on 16 December 2021 in New Delhi.

See also

 Environmental movement
 Prasiddhi Singh
 Haaziq Kazi

References 

Indian activists
Living people
2008 births
Climate activists
BBC 100 Women